John George Rapp (November 1, 1757 in Iptingen, Duchy of Württemberg – August 7, 1847 in Economy, Pennsylvania) was the founder of the religious sect called Harmonists, Harmonites, Rappites, or the Harmony Society.

Born in Iptingen, Duchy of Württemberg, Germany, Rapp became inspired by the philosophies of Jakob Böhme, Philipp Jakob Spener, and Emanuel Swedenborg, among others.  In the 1780s, George Rapp began preaching and soon started to gather a group of his own followers.  His group officially split with the Lutheran Church in 1785 and was promptly banned from meeting.  The persecution that Rapp and his followers experienced caused them to leave Germany and come to the United States in 1803.  Rapp was a Pietist, and a number of his beliefs were shared by the Anabaptists, as well as groups such as the Shakers.

Rapp's religious beliefs and philosophy were the cement that held his community together both in Germany and in the United States – a Christian community and commune, which in the United States organized as the Harmony Society.  The Harmony Society built three US towns, became rich, famous, and survived for 100 years – roughly from 1805 until 1905.

George Rapp and the Harmony Society

In 1791, George Rapp said, "I am a prophet and I am called to be one" in front of the civil affairs official in Maulbronn, Germany, who promptly had him imprisoned for two days and threatened with exile if he did not cease preaching. To the great consternation of church and state authorities, this peasant from Iptingen had become the outspoken leader of several thousand Separatists in the southern German duchy of Württemberg.  In 1798, Rapp and his group of followers had further distanced themselves from mainstream society.  In the Lomersheimer Declaration, written in 1798, Rapp's followers refused to serve in the military or attend Lutheran schools.  By 1802, the Separatists had grown in number to about 12,000 and the Württemberg government decided that they were a dangerous threat to social order.  Rapp was summoned to Maulbronn for an interrogation and the government confiscated Separatist books.  When released in 1803, Rapp told his followers to pool their assets and follow him on a journey for safety to the "land of Israel" in the United States, and soon over 800 people were living with him there.

The initial move scattered the followers and reduced Rapp's original group of 12,000 to many fewer persons.  In 1804, Rapp was able to secure a large tract of land in Pennsylvania and started his first commune.  This first commune, 'Harmonie', (Harmony), Butler County, Pennsylvania, soon grew to a population of about 800, and was highly profitable.  At Harmony, the Harmony Society was formally organized on February 15, 1805, and its members contracted to hold all property in common and to submit to spiritual and material leadership by Rapp and associates.  In 1807, celibacy was advocated as the preferred custom of the community in an attempt to purify themselves for the coming Millennium.

In 1814, the society sold their first town in Pennsylvania to Mennonites for 10 times the amount originally paid for the land, and the entire commune moved out west to Indiana where their new town was also known as Harmony. Ten years after the move to Indiana the commune moved again, this time it returned to Pennsylvania and named their town 'Ökonomie', Economy. The Indiana settlement was sold to Robert Owen, at which point it was renamed New Harmony, Indiana.

George Rapp lived out his remaining days in the town of Economy, Pennsylvania, until August 7, 1847, when he died at the age of 89.

Early life and family

Rapp was the second child and oldest son of the family. His brother, Adam (born on March 9, 1762), and three sisters, Marie Dorothea (born October 11, 1756), Elise Dorothea (born August 7, 1760), and Maria Barbara (born October 21, 1765) later followed him to America; however, Adam died at sea. 

Rapp learned the art of wine making from his father, a farmer. After his father's death in 1771, Rapp trained as a journeyman weaver. He also developed an interest in preaching. Vineyards and textiles would become a part of the agricultural, manufacturing, and commercial economy in all three of the Harmonite towns that were later founded in the United States.

On February 4, 1783, Rapp married Christine Benzinger of Fiolzheim. The couple had two children, a son, Johannes (December 22, 1783 – 1812), and a daughter, Rosine (February 10, 1786 – 1849). Johannes, who trained as a surveyor, died at the age of twenty-nine in an industrial accident. Johannes's name is the only one listed on a stone in the Harmonist cemetery in Harmony, Pennsylvania. (The Harmonists did not mark their graves.) The marker was donated by non-Harmonists and the Society accepted it reluctantly. The specific location of Johannes's gravesite within the cemetery is unknown. Johannes's daughter, Gertrude (1808–89), later became a minor American celebrity and organized the Society's silk production at Economy, Pennsylvania. George Rapp later adopted Frederick Reichert (April 12, 1775 – June 24, 1834). 

Frederick Reichert, Rapp’s adopted son, organized the relocation of Rapp's followers from Württemberg to Pennsylvania in 1804 and supervised the immigration of other Rappites to the United States. Reichert, who became known as Frederick Rapp, was the business leader and public spokesman for the Harmony Society, drew up the town plan for its new village at New Harmony, Indiana, in 1814, and served as one of the delegates to the Indiana Territory's Constitutional Convention in 1816. Frederick Rapp also helped choose the site for the permanent seat of government of Indiana in 1820 that was later named Indianapolis and held leadership roles in several Indiana banks. After the Harmonists sold their Indiana land in 1824, he relocated with other members of the Society to Economy, Pennsylvania, where he died in 1834.

George Rapp was tall, blue eyed, broad shouldered, with long hair and a patriarch's beard.  He had a powerful voice, which matched his commanding presence.

Religious views

Rapp and his followers, the Harmonites, believed Christ would return in their lifetime.  The purpose of the community was to be worthy of Christ and prepare for his return.  They were nonviolent pacifists, refused to serve in the military, and tried to live by George Rapp's philosophy and literal interpretations of the New Testament.  After leaving Germany and coming to the United States, they first settled in (and built) the town of Harmony, Pennsylvania in 1804, and established the Harmony Society in 1805 as a religious commune.  In 1807, celibacy was advocated as the preferred custom of the community in an attempt to purify themselves for the coming Millennium.  Rapp believed that the events and wars going on in the world at the time were a confirmation of his views regarding the imminent Second Coming of Christ, and he also viewed Napoleon as the Antichrist.  Rapp produced a book with his ideas and philosophy, Thoughts on the Destiny of Man, published in German in 1824 and in English a year later.

The Harmonites were Millennialists, in that they believed Jesus Christ was coming to earth in their lifetime to help usher in a thousand-year kingdom of peace on earth.  This is perhaps why they believed that people should try to make themselves "pure" and "perfect", and share things with others while willingly living in communal "harmony" (Acts 4:32-37) and practicing celibacy.  They believed that the old ways of life on earth were coming to an end, and that a new perfect kingdom on earth was about to be realized. They practiced socialism within their community, but traded their exotic agricultural goods, including lemons and figs grown in movable greenhouses, with others.

Rapp and his group also practiced forms of Esoteric Christianity, Mysticism (Christian mysticism), and Rapp often spoke of the virgin spirit or Goddess named Sophia in his writings.  Rapp was very influenced by the writings of Jakob Böhme, Philipp Jakob Spener, and Emanuel Swedenborg, among others.  Also, in Economy, Pennsylvania, there are glass bottles and literature that seems to indicate that the group was interested in (and practiced) alchemy.  Some other books that were found in the Harmony Society's library in Old Economy, Pennsylvania, include those by the following authors: Christoph Schütz, Gottfried Arnold, Justinus Kerner, Thomas Bromley, Jane Leade, Johann Scheible (Sixth and Seventh Books of Moses), Paracelsus, and Georg von Welling (Opus Mago-Cabalisticum), among others.

The Harmonites tended to view unmarried celibate life as morally superior to marriage, based on Rapp's belief that God had originally created Adam as a dual being having male and female sexual organs. According to this view, when the female portion of Adam separated to form Eve, disharmony followed, but one could attempt to regain harmony through celibacy.

Controversy and problems

George Rapp's life was not without controversy and problems.  Rapp and the Harmony Society were involved in protracted legal cases:  many relating to the monetary claims by former Society members who did not feel properly compensated for their time and labor, other cases concerned the ownership and sale of property Society members left in Württemberg, and legal complications from fines and payments made to avoid militia service.  Rapp was called a tyrant and Society members his slaves.   During elections, the Society was seen as a monolithic voting block which caused political ill feelings and generated animosity against Rapp.  He was accused of killing his son Johannes – who died in an industrial accident.  Rapp predicted that on September 15, 1829, the three and one half years of the Sun Woman would end and Christ would begin his reign on earth.  Dissension grew when Rapp's predictions went unfulfilled.  Perhaps his greatest error was in 1831 when he accepted Bernhard Müller, who called himself Maximilian Count de Leon, the "Lion of Judah" as the man who would unite all true Christians.  In the year that followed Rapp changed his mind, but one third of the Society members separated and joined with Müller in establishing a separate community, the New Philadelphian Congregation.  After Rapp's death in 1847, a number of members left the group because of disappointment and disillusionment over the fact that his prophecies regarding the return of Jesus Christ in his lifetime were not fulfilled.  His last words to his followers were, "If I did not so fully believe, that the Lord has designated me to place our society before His presence in the land of Canaan, I would consider this my last".

The Harmonite commune ultimately failed because the policy of celibacy prevented new members from within, and the majority of the outside world had no desire to give up so much to live in a commune. The society was formally dissolved in 1906.

See also
 Harmony Society
 Harmony, Pennsylvania
 New Harmony, Indiana
 Ambridge, Pennsylvania
 Old Economy Village
 Old Economy, Pennsylvania
 Economy, Pennsylvania

References

Bibliography
 Arndt, Karl J. R., George Rapp's Harmony Society 1785–1847, Philadelphia: University of Pennsylvania Press, 1965.
 Arndt, Karl J. R., Harmony on the Connoquenessing 1803–1815, Worcester, Mass. Harmony Society Press, 1980.
 Duss, John S., The Harmonist: A Personal History, Harrisburg, PA, the Pennsylvania Book Service, 1943.
 Stewart, Arthur I. and Veith, Loran W., Harmony: Commemorating the Sesquicentennial of Harmony, Pennsylvania, Harmony, PA., June 1955.

Books and articles in German:

 Fritz, Eberhard: Johann Georg Rapp (1757–1847) und die Separatisten in Iptingen. Mit einer Edition der relevanten Iptinger Kirchenkonventsprotokolle. Blätter für Wuerttembergische Kirchengeschichte 95/1995. S. 129-203.
 Fritz, Eberhard: Radikaler Pietismus in Württemberg. Religioese Ideale im Konflikt mit gesellschaftlichen Realitaeten. Quellen und Forschungen zur wuerttembergischen Kirchengeschichte Band 18.. Epfendorf 2003.
 Fritz, Eberhard: Separatistinnen und Separatisten in Wuerttemberg und in angrenzenden Territorien. Ein biografisches Verzeichnis. Arbeitsbücher des Vereins für Familien- und Wappenkunde. Stuttgart 2005. (Register of Separatists in Wuerttemberg, including most of Rapp's followers).
 Theodor Heuss: Der Räpple, in the same author's Schattenbeschwörung. Wunderlich, Stuttgart/Tübingen 1947; Klöpfer und Meyer, Tübingen 1999.

External links
  with further reading.
 Johann Georg Rapp in the German-language in ADB volume 27 page 286 - 289 with further reading.
 

1757 births
1847 deaths
18th-century alchemists
18th-century apocalypticists
18th-century Christian mystics
19th-century alchemists
19th-century apocalypticists
19th-century Christian mystics
Founders of utopian communities
German alchemists
German Christian religious leaders
German emigrants to the United States
Lutheran pacifists
People from Beaver County, Pennsylvania
People from Enzkreis
People from New Harmony, Indiana
People from the Duchy of Württemberg
Protestant mystics
Radical Pietism